Comic Con Paris, or previously known as Kultima and Comic-Con', is a French multi-genre entertainment and comic convention held annually in Paris, Île-de-France, France.

From 2007 to 2014, it was held at the Parc des Expositions in Villepinte in the northeastern suburbs of Paris. After a break in 2015, it came back in 2016 and is now held at the Grande halle de la Villette in Paris.

History
The festival was created in 2007 under the name of Kultima. It is a French convention on the imaginary of comics, fantasy, science-fiction movies/TV series etc. It took place for the first time in the exhibition Paris-Nord Villepinte in November 2007. In 2009, the name Kultima was abandoned, the convention then was renamed to Comic-Con on the model of American Comic-Con, an American pioneer culture of comics and science fiction.

See also
 Fandom
 Comic Art Convention
 Science fiction convention

External links
Comic-Con Paris Site
ComiConverse Website

Comics conventions
Multigenre conventions
2007 establishments in France
Annual events in Paris
Events in Paris